Lisa Fugard is a South African writer and actor. She was born in Port Elizabeth, South Africa, the only child of playwright Athol Fugard and novelist Sheila Meiring Fugard.

Career
Fugard moved to New York City in 1980 to pursue an acting career, and has garnered numerous stage and film roles, including Isabel Dyson in the original production of her father's My Children! My Africa! She, her husband, and son (born 2004) have lived in the desert of Southern California since early 2002, in Borrego Springs and Encinitas, on the coast north of San Diego.

Since 1992, Fugard has written many short stories for literary magazines, and articles for The New York Times travel section. In January 2006, she wrote the novel Skinner's Drift, about turmoil on a South African farm in 1997.

Talks
Fugard was a guest speaker at the 2007 Literary Guild of Orange County Festival of Women Authors.

References
African odyssey January 2006 BookPage.com Interview by Alden Mudge

External links
Lisa Fugard Official website

21st-century American novelists
21st-century American short story writers
21st-century American women writers
American travel writers
American women travel writers
American women short story writers
American women novelists
Living people
South African people of Dutch descent
People from Port Elizabeth
South African people of English descent
South African people of French descent
South African people of Irish descent
South African women short story writers
South African short story writers
South African travel writers
South African women novelists
South African emigrants to the United States
Year of birth missing (living people)
People from Encinitas, California
People from Borrego Springs, California
21st-century South African novelists
Novelists from California
21st-century American non-fiction writers
South African actresses